"Wir sind wahr" (German for "We Are True") is a song by German recording artist Nena. It was written by Nena, Lukas Hilbert, and Uwe Fahrenkrog-Petersen for her fifteenth studio album Made in Germany (2009), and produced by Nena, Reinhold Heil, Derek von Krogh, and Fahrenkrog-Petersen.

Formats and track listings

Charts

References

External links
"Wir sind wahr" at the official Nena website

2009 singles
2009 songs
Nena songs
Songs written by Lukas Loules
Songs written by Jörn-Uwe Fahrenkrog-Petersen